Mudikondan Kothandaramar Temple is a Hindu temple located in the Tiruvarur district of Tamil Nadu, India, dedicated to Lord Rama, the seventh avatar of Lord Vishnu. The town of Mudikondan is located at a distance of 20 kilometres from Mayiladuthurai and 15 kilometres from Thiruvarur in the Nannilam taluk.

Significance 

There is an idol of Rama in the sanctum sanctorum and a shrine to Hanuman outside the sanctum sanctorum. The temple is associated with the hermitage of the sage Bharadwaja.

Etymology 

The village has received the name Magudavardhanapuri, directly translated in Tamil as Mudikondan, meaning the place of coronation. Lord Rama gave dharshan to Sage Bharadwaja as King of Ayodhya, giving the village its name.

History 
After Rama departure from Ayodhya to take on the forest life as Pithurvakya Paripalana dharma (obeying the command of father), Sri Rama visited the hermitage of Sage Bharadwaja on his way.  When the sage offered him a feast, Sri Rama respectfully declined to accept the offer as he was on a mission then and promised to accept it on his return to Ayodhya.
 
On his return after the Ravana Vadha (killing) while returning to Ayodhya, the Pushpaka Vimana (the divine aircraft) landed at the sage’s ashram.  When sage Bharadwaja offered the dinner, Sri Rama said that he had to perform the puja to Lord Sri Ranganatha before the feast.  The sage installed Sri Ranganatha as desired by Rama.  Rama accepted the feast after worshipping His Kuladevatha Sri Ranganatha.  Here Rama gave darshan to the sage in Cororation form (with crown – Mudi in Tamil) at this place, even before the official coronation at Ayodhya later.  Hence, the place came to be known as Mudikondon. Rama in this temple is also known as Mudikondaramar.

Valmiki Ramayanam yudhakandam 124th sargam first poem directly refers to the Lord Rama's landing at this village referred as the Bharadhwaja Ashram. As a living proof, the village is still inhabited by direct descendants of Sage Bharadhwajar.

पूर्णे चतुर्दशे वर्षे पञ्चम्यां लक्ष्मणाग्रजः |
भरद्वाजाश्रमं प्राप्य ववन्दे नियतो मुनिम् || ६-१२४-१

Greatness of Temple 

Generally Ramar temples are built facing south as Vibhishana from Lanka always wanted to have the darshan of Lord Rama according to scriptures.  But here, the temple is facing east as He gave the darshan to Sage Bharadwaja with Mother Sita and Lakshmana in His coronation form.  However, Lord Sri Ranganatha installed by Sage Bharadwaja is facing south to grace Vibishana. Sri Hanuman has his shrine opposite to the Lord.  The theertha tank is behind Hanuman shrine. The temple is believed to have come into being even before the times of Alwars.Rama is very beautifully made with his neck and hip bending with his Kodandam and arrow in hand.

Religious significance 

This temple is one of the * Pancha Rama Kshetras and considered the foremost among the five temples. Pancha means five and Kshetrams refers to holy places. All the five temples are situated in Tiruvarur district, Tamil Nadu.

 Sri Kodhanda Ramar Temple, Mudikondan
 Sri Kodhanda Ramar Temple, Adambar
 Sri Ramar Temple, Paruthiyur    
 Sri Kodhanda Ramar Temple, Thillaivilagam
 Sri Kodhanda Ramar Temple, Vaduvur

Separate temple for Hanuman 

इति प्रतिसमादिष्टो हनूमान्मारुतात्मजः |
मानुषं धारयन्रूपमयोध्यां त्वरितो ययौ || ६-१२५-१९

Sri Rama sent Sri Anjaneya to meet Bharatha and inform him that He was en route to Ayodhya to prevent Bharatha from taking any extreme step as the 14 years time limit for His return was nearing then.  Sri Anjaneya did his mission perfectly in time and returned to the Lord.  He learnt that the Lord had finished his lunch before his return was annoyed and felt that he was neglected.  Anjaneya, therefore did not enter into the ashram and simply stayed outside.  Sri Rama cooled down Hanuman offering half of his banquet to him. This is attributed to Hanuman’s absence in the sanctum sanctorum as he was angry with Rama and has a separate shrine opposite to him.

Nithya Pooja 

The temple follows the traditions of the Thenkalai sect of Vaishnavite tradition and temple priests perform the pooja (rituals) during festivals and on a daily basis based on Vaiksana Agama. The temple rituals are performed Four times a day: Kalasanthi at 8:00 a.m., Uchikalam at 12:00 p.m., Sayarakshai at 6:00 p.m., and Ardha Jamam at 8:00 p.m. Each ritual has three steps: alangaram (decoration), neivethanam (food offering) and deepa aradanai (waving of lamps) for both Ranganatha Perumal and Kothandarama swamy.

Festivals 

 Every month on the Punarvasu star day being the birth star of Lord Rama, special pujas are performed in the temple.
 Every month on the Ekadesi Thidhi a special Tirumanjanam is performed for Ranganadha Perumal.
 Ramar processions will be happening on the 3rd Saturday in the month of Purattasi (September–October).
 Ranganathar Udaya Garuda seva is happening on the 3rd Saturday of Puratasi
 Sri Ramanavami – 10 day festival ends with Sitarama Kalyanam and procession.
 10 days celebration for Vaikunta Ekadesi to Ranganatha Perumal and on the day of Vaikunta Ekadesi Aganda Vishnu Sahasranama Parayana for 24 hours held in the temple premises.
 Massi Maha theerthavaari -  Ranganatha Perumal goes to nearby village along with chakrathalwar for chakrasnana in thirumalairajan river 
 The other festivals like Krishna Janmashtami, Karthigai, Tamil New Year, Margazhi festival, Sankaranthi, Panguni Uthiram and Rohini uthsavam are celebrated.

References 

Pancha Rama Kshetras
Sarvam Rama Mayam
Sthala Puranam

External links 

Hindu temples in Tiruvarur district
Vishnu temples
Rama temples